Daxu is a town in Gangbei District, Guigang, Guangxi Province, China. , it administers one residential community and the following 18 villages:
Daxu Village
Xinjian Village
Shanglian Village
Xunyang Village
Minle Village
Ganling Village
Yonglong Village
Daren Village
Renxin Village
Chang'an Village
Shigu Village
Yongfu Village
He Village
Jiefang Village
Dongtang Village
Donghuang Village
Zhongxi Village
Letang Village

References

Guigang
Towns of Guangxi